Resolve may refer to:

Resolve (Lagwagon album)
Resolve (Last Tuesday album)
"Resolve" (song), by the Foo Fighters
The Resolve, a 1915 American silent short drama film
"Resolve" (One Tree Hill episode)
Resolve, a British tugboat, formerly Empire Zona
Operation Resolve, an underwater search for the wreckage of South African Airways Flight 295
Claris Resolve, a spreadsheet program
DaVinci Resolve, video editing software
to resolve a server address, in the Domain Name System

See also
Resolved (disambiguation)
Resolution (disambiguation)